Sahan Arachchige (born 13 May 1996) is a Sri Lankan cricketer. He made his first-class debut for Colts Cricket Club in the 2015–16 Premier League Tournament on 2 January 2016.

In August 2018, he was named in Galle's squad the 2018 SLC T20 League. In October 2020, he was drafted by the Galle Gladiators for the inaugural edition of the Lanka Premier League. In August 2021, he was named in the SLC Blues team for the 2021 SLC Invitational T20 League tournament.

In June 2022, he was named in the Sri Lanka A squad for their matches against Australia A during Australia's tour of Sri Lanka.

References

External links
 

1996 births
Living people
Sri Lankan cricketers
Colts Cricket Club cricketers
Cricketers from Colombo
Galle Gladiators cricketers